This was the first edition of the tournament.

David Goffin won the title after defeating Mikael Ymer 6–4, 6–1 in the final.

Seeds

Draw

Finals

Top half

Bottom half

References

External links
Main draw
Qualifying draw

BW Open - 1